WLXB (98.9 FM) is a radio station airing a Contemporary Christian music format. Licensed to Bethel, North Carolina, United States, it serves the Greenville-New Bern area.

History
WLXB went on the air in 1989 as WDRP. On 1990-09-03, the station changed its call sign to WVSG, on 1990-10-01 to WDRP, on 2002-09-01 to WIAM-FM, on 2004-05-17 to WNBR-FM, and on 2015-04-27 to WLXB.

From 2004 to 2015, WNBR-FM played classic country as "The Bear", simulcasting WNBB.

References

External links

K-Love radio stations
Contemporary Christian radio stations in the United States
Radio stations established in 1989
1989 establishments in North Carolina
Educational Media Foundation radio stations
LXB